Clyde Lewis (born 1997) is an Australian competitive swimmer. 

Clyde Lewis may also refer to:

 Clyde Lewis (cartoonist) (1911–1976), American cartoonist